Mohd Zain bin Haji Abdul Ghani (died 14 May 1997) was a Malaysian politician from Malacca state. He was the Chief Minister of Malacca from 14 October 1994 to 14 May 1997.

Political background
Mohd Zin successfully ran as Kelemak State Assemblyman. Mohd Zin appointed as Chief Minister of Malacca to replace Tan Sri Abdul Rahim Thamby Chik who has resigned as Chief Minister following the involvement with a scandal involving an underage girl. He was swearing as a Chief Minister in front of the Yang di-Pertua Negeri Melaka (Governor), Tun Syed Ahmad Syed Mahmud Shahabudin.

As Chief Minister, he also led the Malacca Customary Land Development Corporation (PERTAM). The Malacca State Cultured Seminary was held on 16 April 1996 in collaboration with the Chief Minister and was officially opened by Deputy Prime Minister of Malaysia, Anwar Ibrahim. Mohd Zin also involved in the opening of the National Arts Day on 27 May 1995, the inauguration of the Museum of Arts 28 May 1995 and the launch of Munshi Abdullah speech organised by the Melaka Malay 9 December 1995.

Issues and controversies
During his administration, there was talk of privatisation Malacca Water Corporation (PAM) (now Syarikat Air Melaka (SAMB)) to Gibca Holdings Sdn. Bhd. and the agreement should be signed in May 1997. However the privatisation was postponed following the death of Mohd Zin on 14 May 1997.

On 11 April 1998, Mohd Zin's name was linked to a fraud case involving the former Malacca State Government Secretary, Datuk Wira Abdul Rahman Jamal regarding the Sports Complex project in Paya Rumput worth (RM260 million). Abdul Rahman claimed that he was instructed by the former Chief Minister of Malacca, Mohd Zin Abdul Ghani to write a letter of recommendation for the approval of the Ministry of Finance.

Election results

Died
Mohd Zin died on 14 May 1997 in Tawakkal Hospital, Kuala Lumpur, age of 56. He was buried at Kampung Pengkalan Muslim Cemetery near his hometown at Alor Gajah, Melaka. After Zin's death, he was replaced by Abu Zahar Ithnin as a Chief Minister.

Memorials

Alor Gajah
 The Pengkalan Intersection at Lebuh AMJ (Federal Route 19) was renamed as Datuk Seri Mohd Zin Intersection.
 Jalan Tampin on Federal Route 61 was renamed as Jalan Dato' Mohd Zin
 Sekolah Menengah Teknik Datuk Seri Mohd Zin, a secondary school.
 Kolej Vokasional Datuk Seri Mohd Zin, a vocational college at Kampung Pengkalan.

Melaka City/Batu Berendam
 Jalan Dato' Mohd Zin, a major roads in Batu Berendam

References

1997 deaths
1941 births
People from Malacca
Chief Ministers of Malacca
Malaysian Muslims
Malaysian people of Malay descent
United Malays National Organisation politicians
Members of the Malacca State Legislative Assembly
Malacca state executive councillors